John Chambers may refer to:
 John Chambre (1470–1549), also Chambers, English churchman, academic and physician
 John Chambers (bishop) (died 1556), last abbot of Peterborough abbey and, after the dissolution, the first bishop of Peterborough
 John Chambers (topographer) (1780–1839), English antiquarian
 John Chambers (politician) (1780–1852), American politician, governor of Iowa Territory in 1841–1845
 John David Chambers (1805–1893), English legal and liturgical writer
 John Chambers (Australian pastoralist) (c. 1815–1889), Australian pioneer, brother of James Chambers (pastoralist)
 John Chambers (pastoralist) (1819–1893), New Zealand pastoralist, community leader and businessman
 John Chambers (businessman) (c. 1839–1903), New Zealand businessman
 John G. Chambers (Delaware politician), member of the 67th Delaware General Assembly
 John Graham Chambers (1843–1883), codified the "Marquess of Queensberry rules", upon which modern day boxing is based
 John Green Chambers (1798–1884), American politician from Texas
 John M. Chambers (politician) (1845–1916), Irish-American businessman and politician from New York
 John Chambers (artist) (1852–1928), British landscape, seascape and portrait painter
 John Chambers Hughes (1891–1971), United States diplomat
 John Chambers (make-up artist) (1922–2001), American make-up artist, won a special Oscar for his work on Planet of the Apes
 John Thomas Chambers Jr. (1928–2011), American politician from Maryland
 John Chambers (Australian cricketer) (1930–2017), Australian cricketer
 John Chambers (footballer) (born 1949), English footballer
 John T. Chambers (born 1949), American businessman and former CEO of Cisco Systems
 John B. Chambers (born 1956), evaluator of sovereign debt for Standard & Poor's
 John Chambers (English cricketer) (born 1971), English cricketer
 John Chambers (writer), American television soap opera writer
 John Chambers (statistician), creator of the S programming language and core member of the R programming language project
 John Chambers (scientist), one of two scientists who formulated the Planet V theory in 2002

See also
Jack Chambers (disambiguation)
John Chamber (disambiguation)